Gregory W. Vogle (born 1958) is an American intelligence officer who served as the Director of the National Clandestine Service from January 29, 2015 until August 2017. He is a recipient of the Distinguished Intelligence Cross, the nation's highest intelligence award for valor, often described as a Medal of Honor equivalent, for his actions to defend Afghan President Hamid Karzai and his troops against an attack on their position by the Taliban in Tarinkot, Afghanistan.

Career 
Vogle served in the United States Marine Corps as an infantry officer from 1981 to 1986. Vogle joined the Central Intelligence Agency in 1986 as a paramilitary operations officer within the CIA’s Special Activities Division (SAD) and deployed to Africa, Bosnia, Pakistan and Middle East. He worked with various parties in the United States Intelligence Community, including the United States Department of Defense. Vogle is now a Principal at McChrystal Group, an advisory firm based in Alexandria, Virginia.

Rescue of Hamid Karzai 
On October 9, 2001 Hamid Karzai entered Afghanistan and linked up with his supporters to seize Tarinkot. Taliban forces launched a counterattack against Karzai's lightly-armed forces and he was forced to withdraw. On November 3, Karzai contacted a member of the Special Activities Center, identified only as "Greg V." who immediately acted by linking up Karzai and himself with his joint CIA/Army Special Forces/JSOC team (consisted of 110 CIA officers, 316 Special Forces soldiers and 12 Joint Special Operations Command (JSOC) raiders) designated Echo team. From there, they made a nighttime insertion back into Tarinkot. Karzai then went from village to village seeking support to fight against the Taliban. On November 17, a large battle ensued. Several of Karzai's new recruits fled, but Vogle took command and ran between defensive positions shouting, "If necessary, die like men!". The line held and as CIA Director George Tenet said in his book Center of the Storm, "It was a seminal moment. Had Karzai's position been overrun, as appeared likely for much of November 17, the entire future of the Pashtun rebellion in the south could have ended." Vogle was awarded the Distinguished Intelligence Cross, the CIA's highest award for valor, and the equivalent of the Medal of Honor for those in the intelligence community. 

Later on December 5, Karzai was leading his resistance force against the Taliban at Khandahar, their capital and one of their last remaining strongholds. Vogle was the lead paramilitary advisor to Karzai in this battle when, as a result of a mistake in calculating an air strike, a bomb was dropped on their position. Vogle threw his body on Karzai and saved his life. The same day Khandahar fell and Karzai was named the interim Prime Minister.

Later career
Vogle was awarded the Intelligence Star in 2003 for heroism during classified operations in Iraq supporting Operation Iraqi Freedom. Vogle then served as station chief in Kabul, Afghanistan from 2004-2006 and 2009-2010 with tours at CIA headquarters as deputy chief of a Branch in SAD and chief of Ground Branch within Special Operations Group, Special Activities Division. In January 2015 Vogle was selected as chief of National Clandestine Service, later renamed as Directorate of Operations. After retiring from the CIA in 2017, agency director Gina Haspel selected Elizabeth Kimber, a 34-year career CIA officer, to succeed Vogle.

In November 2020, Vogle was named a volunteer member of the Joe Biden presidential transition Agency Review Team to support transition efforts related to the United States Intelligence Community.

References 

Living people
1958 births
United States Marine Corps officers